Lewinsky is an Ashkenazi Jewish (Yiddish) surname in West Slavic form, derived from Levite. Notable people with the surname include:

 Abraham Lewinsky (18661941), German rabbi
 Elhanan Leib Lewinsky, Hebrew writer and Zionist
 Bernard Lewinsky (born 1943), oncologist and father of Monica Lewinsky
 Charles Lewinsky (born 1946), Swiss writer
 Monica Lewinsky (born 1973), former White House intern

See also 
 Levinsky
 Lewinski

Levite surnames
West Slavic-language surnames
East Slavic-language surnames
Jewish surnames
Yiddish-language surnames
he:לוינסקי